Cestné a Stavebné Mechanizmy Tisovec a.s. is a public company making military machinery, and based in Detva, Slovakia. 

In 1955, the Podpolianské Strojárny (PPS) plant was built in Detva, then part of Communist Czechoslovakia to make military machinery. The factory at that time produced "UNC" machinery, that is "Universal" to Western European markets. Machinery such as front loaders and skid steer loaders reached an annual production of 4,000. The factory was the major employer in Detva, at one time employing over 70% of Detva's population. In 1967 the Directorate-General in Prague ordered the plant be increased in size, with additional housing being built in what is known as New Detva.  In 1978 the plant changed its name to "ZÁVODY ŤAŽKÉHO STROJÁRSTVA".

After the Velvet Revolution in 1989 and the split of Slovakia from the Czech Republic, illegal and non-transparent privatization, typical of Central and Eastern European states, took place and the factory had to put its production on halt and downsize its workforce from 8,000 in 1993 to 1,000 in 2005. In 1990 the plant changed its name again due to new laws and statutes to "ZÁVODY ŤAŽKÉHO STROJÁRSTVA  Tisovec, š.p.", being a state-owned enterprise, and in 1992 the plant became a publicly traded company going by the name of "CESTNÉ A STAVEBNÉ MECHANIZMY Tisovec a.s."

External links
CESTNÉ A STAVEBNÉ MECHANIZMY TISOVEC (in English)

Manufacturing companies of Slovakia
Manufacturing companies of Czechoslovakia